Phoebe or Phœbe may refer to:


People and characters
 Phoebe (given name), a list of people, mythological, biblical and fictional characters
Phoebe (Greek myth), several characters
 Phoebe, an epithet of Artemis/Diana and Selene/Luna, in Greek and Roman mythology, the moon goddesses
 Phoebe (biblical figure), deacon
 Anna Phoebe (born 1981), German-born British violinist

Plants and animals
 Phoebe (beetle), a genus of longhorn beetles
 Phoebe (bird), the common name for birds of genus Sayornis
 Phoebe (plant), a genus of flowering plants

Ships
Phoebe, a sailing ship chartered by the New Zealand Company in 1842
 , various ships
 , two minesweepers

Other uses
 Phoebe (moon), a small outer moon of Saturn
 Phoebe (computer), Acorn Computers' never-released successor to the Risc PC
 Phoebe (George Mason University journal), a literary journal published by George Mason University
 Phoebe (State University of New York journal), a gender studies journal published by the State University of New York
 Phoebe, New Zealand, a locality in the Hurunui District
 "Phoebe", a song by Lazlo Bane from their 2006 album, Back Sides

See also
Phebe
Phoebus (disambiguation)